David B. Lobell is an agricultural ecologist. He is currently the Gloria and Richard Kushel Director of the Center on Food Security and the Environment and Professor of Earth System Science at Stanford University. He is additionally a William Wrigley Fellow at the Stanford Woods Institute for the Environment and a Senior Fellow at Stanford's Freeman Spogli Institute for International Studies. Lobell was awarded a MacArthur "Genius" Fellowship in 2013 for "unearthing richly informative, but often underutilized, sources of data to investigate the impact of climate change on crop production and global food security."

Education 
Lobell earned a Bachelor of Science in applied mathematics from Brown University in 2000. He received his Ph.D. in 2005 from Stanford University's Department of Geological and Environmental Sciences. From 2005 to 2008, he was a Lawrence Fellow at Lawrence Livermore National Laboratory.

Work

Lobell's work deals primarily with food security. He also investigates the impact of climate change on crop yields.

Honors and awards 

 MacArthur Fellow, 2013
 Honorary Doctor of Science, Brown University, 2021
 NAS Prize in Food and Agriculture Sciences (2022)

References

External links 

 

MacArthur Fellows
Stanford University staff
Brown University alumni
Stanford University alumni
Living people
Year of birth missing (living people)
People from Stanford, California